The Government College of Engineering, Kalahandi (GCEK), is a public engineering autonomous college under the state government of Odisha at Bhawanipatna in the Kalahandi district. The college was established in the year 2009 as a constituent college of Biju Patnaik University of Technology (BPUT) to offer undergraduate B.Tech degree program. Later in the year 2015, the college started offering two postgraduate M.Tech degree programs. It is now an autonomous college from 21 January 2021 along with PMEC, Bramhapur and GCE, Keonjhar.

Campus
GCEK started its classes at Sardar Rajas Medical College and Hospital campus at Jaring, a place 17 km. from Bhawanipatna towards Junagarh, Kalahandi. After a year and a half, the college shifted to its permanent campus beside NH 26 (previously NH 201) at Bandopala, 5 km. from Bhawanipatna towards Junagarh. Bhawanipatna is the district headquarters of Kalahandi district where the college is located.

Academic structure 
The college provides B.Tech. degrees in Civil Engineering, Computer Science Engineering, Electrical Engineering, and Mechanical Engineering. Currently, the college provides M.Tech degrees only in Electrical Engineering and Mechanical Engineering.

Admission to both the B.Tech and the M.Tech program is made through Odisha JEE conducted each year by the Government of Odisha.

Facilities 
Central Library

The institute has a Central Library, which has a versatile collection of books in thousands in numbers for all the branches of engineering taught in the college. The students can choose from 11684 books for their study and project work. Many national/international periodicals, journals, magazines are also available in Library for the users. The library is open to the users from 10 AM to 6 PM for issuing books, and the reading room can be used from 7 AM to 2 AM.

Computer Center

A state-of-the-art Computer Center is present inside the main building of the institute, which serves as a central facility for all the departments. The center is connected through a 20 Mbit/s high-speed internet network provided by NMICT. The center is also well equipped with multifunction printers, scanners, and LCD projectors apart from all relevant software.

Hostels

The college has three hostels within its campus which include two boys hostels and one girls hostel. The hostel facilities are very good and the environment in the hostel is also conducive for academic and overall wellbeing. The intake capacity of each of the hostel is 300.

Events
 INSPRANO is the annual tech fest.
 AWAHAAN is the annual sports meet.
 ANUGOONJ is the annual cultural festival.
 UDAAN is the annual student activity competition.
 QUASAR is the annual magazine.
 Civilineous is the freshers' party of the Civil branch. 
 Terminators is the freshers' party of the Mechanical branch.
 Electromania is the freshers' party of the Electrical branch.
 Techsplosion is the freshers' party of the Computer Science branch.

References

External links 
 Official Website

Engineering colleges in Odisha
Colleges affiliated with Biju Patnaik University of Technology
Kalahandi district
Educational institutions established in 2009
2009 establishments in Orissa